Thomas Grosvenor (March 1734 – 12 February 1795) was a British politician who sat in the House of Commons for 40 years from 1755 to 1795.

Background
Grosvenor was the second son of Sir Robert Grosvenor, 6th Baronet, and Jane, daughter and heiress of Thomas Warre of Swell Court, Somerset. Richard Grosvenor, 1st Earl Grosvenor, was his elder brother.

Political career
Grosvenor sat as Member of Parliament for Chester from 1755 to 1795. In 1784 he was the leader of the St. Alban's Tavern group who tried to bring Fox and Pitt together.

Family
Grosvenor died in February 1795, aged 60.

Grosvenor had married Deborah, daughter of Stephen Skynner, in 1758. They lived at Swell Court in Somerset and had four sons and two daughters. Their eldest surviving son Richard Erle-Drax-Grosvenor was a Member of Parliament while their third son Thomas Grosvenor was a distinguished military commander.

References

1734 births
1795 deaths
Members of the Parliament of Great Britain for English constituencies
Younger sons of baronets
Thomas
British MPs 1754–1761
British MPs 1761–1768
British MPs 1768–1774
British MPs 1774–1780
British MPs 1780–1784
British MPs 1784–1790
British MPs 1790–1796